The 2006 Notre Dame Fighting Irish football team represented the University of Notre Dame in the 2006 NCAA Division I FBS football season. The team was coached by Charlie Weis and played its home games at Notre Dame Stadium in South Bend, Indiana. The team completed the season with a record of ten wins and three losses that culminated in a post-season appearance in the 2007 Sugar Bowl and a number 19 ranking in the nation.

Pre-season
After finishing 9–3 in 2005, Notre Dame began the 2006 season ranked No. 3 in the USA Today Coaches Poll and No. 2 in the Associated Press Poll.  These were Notre Dame's highest preseason rankings since 1994, when they occupied the same positions in both polls.

Roster changes
The Irish lost nine former starters to graduation and the NFL after the 2005 season, including five offensive starters, three defensive, and placekicker D.J. Fitzpatrick. However, the Irish returned many key players such as quarterback Brady Quinn, wide receiver Jeff Samardzija, running back Darius Walker, and safety Tom Zbikowski from the previous year's squad, Notre Dame received much pre-season hype as a possible national championship contender.

Recruits
In Weis' first full year of recruiting, the Irish signed 28 recruits. The top ten ranked recruiting class, included three five star recruits on offense and 14 four star recruits with eight on offense and six on defense.

Award candidates
Quinn also entered the season as one of the favorites to win the coveted Heisman Trophy.
Along with Quinn, the following Fighting Irish football players were named to national award watchlists for the 2006 season:

Brady Quinn – Maxwell Award, Walter Camp Award
Jeff Samardzija – Maxwell Award, Walter Camp Award
Darius Walker – Maxwell Award
Tom Zbikowski – Nagurski Award, Bednarik Award
Ryan Harris – Outland Trophy
Victor Abiamiri – Ted Hendricks Award
John Sullivan – Dave Rimington Trophy

Notre Dame's three players on the Maxwell Award watchlist tied Miami, Michigan, Ohio State, and USC for most nominees.

Schedule

Rankings

Roster

Coaching staff

Game summaries

Georgia Tech
Pregame Line: ND −7.5

Georgia Tech drew first blood when quarterback Reggie Ball connected on a four-yard touchdown pass with receiver Calvin Johnson at the end of the first quarter.  Georgia Tech's defense continued to menace 3rd-ranked Notre Dame's offense, while a Travis Bell field goal increased Tech's lead to 10–0.  It was the last time Georgia Tech would score, however.  Notre Dame orchestrated a 14-play, 80-yard drive right before the half, punctuated by a five-yard rushing touchdown from Brady Quinn, to close the score to 10–7 at the half.  Coach Charlie Weis adjusted at halftime and began the second half determined to establish the Irish running game.  The move paid off when running back Darius Walker hit paydirt on Notre Dame's first drive of the second half, scoring on a 13-yard touchdown run to put the Irish ahead for the first time in 2006, 14–10.  Both defenses tightened, as the teams traded punts.  With Notre Dame facing a 4th-and-1 at the Georgia Tech 47-yard line with 1:10 left to play in the game, Georgia Tech appeared to be on the verge of getting the ball back with a chance to win the game.  However, Weis gambled and elected to go for the first down rather than punt.  Weis' gamble was rewarded when Quinn picked up the yard on a quarterback sneak, giving Notre Dame the first down and enabling them to run the clock out for the 14–10 victory.

Quinn completed 23 of 38 passes for 246 yards.  Quinn rushed for a score, but was held without a passing touchdown.  Walker rushed 22 times for 99 yards and one touchdown, while Rhema McKnight was Notre Dame's leading receiver with 8 receptions for 108 yards.  Despite being confounded by Georgia Tech's defense all night, Notre Dame was able to seize control during the second half and walk away with the victory in its 2006 season opener.

Both teams notably had a player who would go on to be better known in a different sport, for Notre Dame wide receiver Jeff Samardzija would join Major League Baseball's Chicago Cubs and Georgia Tech defensive lineman Joe Anoa'i would sign with WWE and become a multi-time world champion as Roman Reigns.

Penn State
Pregame Line: ND −8.5

Penn State came to Notre Dame for the first time since the 1992 Snow Bowl game between the two. The game began as a defensive battle with Notre Dame scoring the only points of the first quarter on a field goal.  However, the Irish offense picked up in the second quarter as quarterback Brady Quinn threw two touchdown passes (his first of the season) to Jeff Samardzija and Rhema McKnight.  With another field goal, Notre Dame led 20–0 at the half.  In the third quarter Penn State quarterback, Anthony Morelli fumbled the ball during a lateral pass as he ran an option play.  Tom Zbikowski picked up the fumble and ran it for a touchdown.  Penn State would score their first points later in the quarter on a 28-yard field goal by Kevin Kelly, but the Irish scored again on a 1-yard touchdown run by Travis Thomas.  In the fourth quarter Brady Quinn threw a third touchdown to Darius Walker, Morelli threw his only touchdown of the day to Deon Butler, and Penn State running back Daryll Clark ran a 5-yard touchdown with time running out.  The game ended with Notre Dame winning 41–17.

Michigan
Pregame Line: ND −5.5

The Michigan Wolverines came to Notre Dame having lost three of the last four games to the Irish and having not won at Notre Dame since 1994, the year before Lloyd Carr became head coach.  The game began with Notre Dame receiving the ball on the opening kickoff.  On the second play, Brady Quinn's pass was intercepted by Prescott Burgess who ran it back for a 21-yard touchdown to put Michigan ahead 7–0.  After a punt on Notre Dame's next drive Michigan quarterback Chad Henne threw an interception to Chinedum Ndukwe which was returned to the 4-yard line to set up a Brady Quinn touchdown pass to Ashley McConnell.  Michigan would score the next 27 points with three touchdown passes by Henne to Mario Manningham and a run by Mike Hart.  The Irish would score with a touchdown pass to Jeff Samardzija before halftime to leave the score 34–14.  In the third quarter Michigan kicked two more field goals, one after Brady Quinn's second interception in the game.  Brady Quinn threw a touchdown in the fourth quarter to Rhema McKnight to end the Irish scoring.  The Wolverines ended any chance of a comeback when, while being sacked, Quinn's fumble was returned for a 54-yard touchdown by LaMarr Woodley.  The game ended as a Wolverine blowout of 47–21, giving Lloyd Carr his first win in Notre Dame.

Michigan State
Pregame Line: ND −3.0

The game between Notre Dame and Michigan State in East Lansing seemed doomed to be overshadowed by pregame hype.  A controversial incident where Spartan players planted a flag in Notre Dame's field after Michigan State's 2005 win was talked about in the week leading up to the game.  Spartan officials said the incident occurred because Notre Dame didn't present the Megaphone Trophy after the game and players needed to celebrate.  Irish officials stated that they never presented rivalry trophies after games, but sent them later in the week.  More controversy was sparked when it was reported that Irish head coach Charlie Weis told a group of Notre Dame alumni during the summer of 2006 that he would never lose to Michigan State again as head coach.  Weis denied it, but nevertheless Spartans used it as motivation.  Added to these controversies was the fact that 2006 marks the 40th anniversary of the Game of the Century between the teams.  Before the game Michigan State brought back players from that team and retired Bubba Smith's jersey. The controversies continued into the game when a late hit on Michigan State's quarterback by the Notre Dame bench lead to a scuffle between the teams and Charlie Weis claiming an MSU player slapped him in the face. This claim brought a penalty from the officials, and after the game John L. Smith implied that Charlie Weis had lied about a slap that could not be seen on any replay footage.

The game was played in windy and rainy conditions for most of the night.  Notre Dame won the coin toss and took the ball as Charlie Weis normally does.  Michigan State chose to play with the wind at their backs for the first quarter.  The commentators for the game, especially Bob Davie, questioned Weis' decision, believing that the windy conditions would affect play significantly.  It seemed to as Notre Dame was held without a score for the entire first quarter, while the Spartans threw two quick touchdowns, one after a fumble on a punt return by Tom Zbikowski, and added a field goal before having to change sides.  In the second quarter Notre Dame switched to a no-huddle offense with worked to confuse the Spartan defense for a drive allowing Brady Quinn to throw a 32-yard touchdown to Rhema McKnight.  On their next drive, however, Quinn threw an interception to Ervin Baldwin which was returned for a 19-yard touchdown to give the Spartans a 24–7 lead.  Quinn would throw another touchdown to Jeff Samardzija and Spartan quarterback Drew Stanton would add another touchdown pass to Kerry Reed to end the half with the Spartans leading 31–14.

The second half began with a defensive stop by the Irish which allowed Quinn to throw a third touchdown of 62-yards to John Carlson to cut the Spartan lead to 10.  However, later in the quarter Michigan State's Jehuu Caulcrick would run for a 30-yard touchdown.  The Spartans failed in a two-point conversion attempt leaving the score 37–21 at the end of the third quarter.  In the fourth quarter, Michigan State had the ball at the Notre Dame 42-yard line and looked to score again.  However a series of miscues and holding penalties halted the Spartan drive and forced them to punt.  Quinn took advantage and threw a fourth touchdown to Jeff Samardzija.  The Irish attempted a two-point conversion to make their deficit only 8, but failed, leaving the score 37–27 with 8 minutes left in the game.  On the ensuing drive, a Stanton fumble was recovered by the Irish on the Spartan 24-yard line.  Aided by a pass interference call on 3rd down and 25-yards to go, Quinn would throw his fifth touchdown pass of the evening to Rhema McKnight.  The extra point was missed leaving the Spartans ahead 37–33.  On the next drive, Stanton threw an interception to Terrail Lambert which was returned 23-yards for the go-ahead touchdown.  The Irish led 40–37 with almost 3 minutes left.  Stanton would take the Spartans to the Notre Dame 44-yard line before throwing a pass which was tipped twice and which Terrail Lambert would catch off of the back of a Spartan wide receiver to end the game, with the Irish winning 40–37.

Purdue
Pregame Line: ND −14.0

The Purdue Boilermakers came to Notre Dame undefeated, but still underdogs to the Irish.  Notre Dame started the scoring with a 70-yard opening drive capped with an 11-yard run by George West for a touchdown, their first opening drive touchdown of the year.  Purdue tied the game later in the quarter with a 7-yard run by Kory Sheets.  However, the Irish completed another long drive with a 14-yard touchdown run by Darius Walker to put them in the lead 14–7 at the end of the first quarter.  Brady Quinn threw his first touchdown of the game to Rhema McKnight for 6-yards halfway through the second quarter.  With a little over a minute remaining before halftime, the Irish faked a field goal and Jeff Samardzija, the holder, ran for a 5-yard touchdown.  However, 30 seconds later, Purdue quarterback Curtis Painter threw an 88-yard touchdown pass to Selwyn Lymon to put the halftime score at 28–14, in favor of Notre Dame.

The only score in the third quarter was a 12-yard touchdown pass by Brady Quinn to Rhema McKnight to give the Irish a 21-point lead.  In the fourth quarter, Curtis Painter threw a 9-yard touchdown to Selwyn Lymon to give the final score of 35–21, Notre Dame winning.  At the end of the game, Lymon had 238 receiving yards, the second most yards ever for a Purdue receiver and the most receiving yards ever against the Irish.  The teams combined for 955 total yards, and only 242-yards were from rushing.  Darius Walker ran for 146 of those yards himself.

Stanford
Pregame Line: ND −29.5

The Stanford Cardinal came to Notre Dame winless and big underdogs.  However, in the first half the Cardinal kept the game closer than expected.  The Irish started the game taking their opening drive for a touchdown.  Brady Quinn threw an 8-yard pass to Jeff Samardzija to cap off a 91-yard drive which consumed more than seven minutes off the clock.  The Cardinal's opening possession took advantage of a porous Irish defense which was without linebacker Travis Thomas and safety Tom Zbikowski, both out with injuries.  Stanford drove to the Irish 3-yard line before being forced to kick a field goal after a sure touchdown was dropped.  The Cardinal took six minutes off the clock themselves and the first quarter ended with Notre Dame winning 7–3.  The second quarter was uneventful until the Notre Dame's final drive, which began with just over two minutes left in the half.  Brady Quinn orchestrated a 72-yard drive which resulted in a 16-yard pass to Rhema McKnight to put the Irish up 14–3 at halftime.

In the third quarter the Irish began to pull away.  Darius Walker ran for a 32-yard touchdown, his longest run of the season, to give the Irish an 18-point lead.  Later in the quarter, Carl Gioia added a 32-yard field goal to put the Irish up 24–3 at the end of the third quarter.  In the fourth quarter the Cardinal used a trick play to get on the scoreboard again.  On a toss play to running back Anthony Kimble, Kimble threw a 57-yard touchdown to a wide open Kelton Lynn.  The score brought the Cardinal within 14.  Later in the quarter, Brady Quinn would throw his third touchdown of the game to tight end John Carlson to give the final margin of victory, 31–10, in favor of the Irish.

UCLA
Pregame Line: ND −13

After trailing UCLA for most of the game, Brady Quinn was able to lead Notre Dame to a miraculous last minute comeback that may have saved Notre Dame's BCS hopes, as well as Quinn's Heisman candidacy.

Notre Dame got on the board first when Quinn capped a 7-play, 44-yard drive with a two-yard touchdown pass to Jeff Samardzija.  UCLA would roar back, however, scoring fourteen unanswered second quarter points before Notre Dame would add a field goal as the quarter expired.  Down 14–10 heading into the locker room at halftime, the situation looked grim for the Irish, who were unable to deal with the relentless UCLA defense.

Notre Dame would cut the Bruins' lead to one when Carl Gioia capped a long, 14-play, 60-yard drive with a 33-yard field goal near the end of the third quarter.  UCLA would answer with a field goal of its own midway through the fourth quarter to push its lead to 17–13.

The UCLA defense continued to frustrate the Notre Dame offense, and it appeared the Bruins had the game won after stopping Notre Dame on a fourth-and-1 attempt from the UCLA 35 with 2:25 remaining in the game.  UCLA, though, was unable to run the clock out.  UCLA was forced to punt after running three straight running plays that netted 6 yards.  UCLA was only able to take 1:19 off the clock with its three running plays.

After Aaron Perez's 59-yard punt resulted in a touchback, Notre Dame took over on its own 20-yard line with :55 remaining in the game, needing a touchdown to avoid its second loss of the season.  Rather than blitz Quinn, UCLA head coach Karl Dorrell opted to rush only his four down linemen.  UCLA was unable to generate any kind of a pass rush against the Notre Dame offensive line, allowing the masterful Quinn to pick apart the Bruin defense with surgical precision.  On the first play of the drive, Quinn dropped back deep, but was initially unable to find an open man.  Quinn started to roll out to his right before he spotted Samardzija along the right sideline and fired a 21-yard strike that moved the Irish to the Notre Dame 41-yard line.  Quinn picked up 14 yards on the next play with a completion to wide receiver David Grimes, bringing Notre Dame to the UCLA 45.

Before the Bruins knew what hit them, Notre Dame had taken the lead.  After taking a five step drop, Quinn pump-faked and began to roll to his right in search of an open receiver.  Quinn spotted Samardzija open on the right side of the field and delivered a bullet to the Irish receiver.  Samardzija caught the ball at the 30-yard line and then jutted towards the middle of the field, weaving in and out of Bruin defenders before momentarily losing his balance after taking a hit from UCLA safety Dennis Keyes near the 15-yard line.  Samardzija was quickly able to regain his footing, jumping the final yard into the end zone and scoring the winning touchdown with the ball raised aloft.

The touchdown, which came with just :27 left in the game, was only the third game-winning touchdown in Notre Dame history come with less than :30 remaining in the game, the other two occurring in the 1979 Cotton Bowl Classic and a 1992 game against Penn State.

Quinn finished the game 27 of 45 for 304 yards and 2 touchdowns, thrusting himself back into the forefront of the Heisman race with his late game heroics.  With the victory, Notre Dame improved its record to 6–1 on the season.

Navy
Pregame Line: ND −13.5

Brady Quinn has put himself back in Heisman contention after a fantastic performance against Navy. He made 18 of 25 passes and threw for 296 yards making 3 TD passes. He also showed his footwork by taking a TD in from 19 yards out.

The Irish started out their scoring quickly with Carl Gioia hitting a 40-yard FG, 3:15 into the game putting them up 3–0 and ended the 1st quarter with a 36-yard pass from Quinn to WR David Grimes to make it a 10–0 game with 1:32 left.

Navy got back in the game  quickly with a 1-yd run by Kaipo-Noa Kaheaku-Enhada to make 10–7 with 11:39 left in the half, but the Irish came back quickly with Travis Thomas running in a ball 16 yards to make it a 17–7 game with 8 min. left in the half. But Kaheaku-Enhada once again got Navy back in the game with another 1-yard run to make 17–14 with 2:43 left in the half giving Navy only a 3 pt deficit. Quinn turned right around and hit hitting Rhema McKnight with a 33-yard pass and his 2nd TD pass with a 1:19 left to give Notre Dame a 24–14 lead heading into halftime.

Quinn continued his dominance in the second half leading 3 strong drives two of them scoring TDs. With 8:10 left in the 3rd, Quinn ran in a TD from 19 yards out to give the Irish a 31–14 lead the drive was helped out by a late hit call on 3rd and 19 that allowed Quinn to make the play. The second drive stalled at the 1 when the Midshipmen's defense held. The third drive however ended with Quinn hitting McKnight with a 6-yard pass and his 2nd TD catch and Quinn's 3rd TD pass with 9:36 left in the game, to give the Irish a 38–14 final.

North Carolina
Pregame Line: ND −28

Notre Dame gets another win and Brady Quinn makes another case for the Heisman Trophy going 23 of 35 for 346 yards and 4 TDs. The game started with Brady Quinn hitting Rhema McKnight for a 7-yd TD pass and giving Notre Dame a 7–0 lead. But UNC came back with Joe Dailey throwing a 12-yd TD pass to Jesse Holley to knot up the score 7–7. But Notre Dame came back with Quinn throwing an 11-yd strike to John Carlson to close out the 1st quarter 14–7. The 2nd quarter started like the 1st with Quinn hitting McKnight for a 14-yd TD pass putting the Irish up 21–7 and Carl Gioia hit a 27-yd kick to make it 24–7 but UNC's Brandon Tate would return the kickoff 90-yds for a TD, the only saving grace being that the XP was blocked making the score 24–13. The half closed out with Tom Zbikowski returning a punt 52 yds for a TD and increasing the lead to 31–13 going into the half.

Joe Dailey would start off the scoring in the second half with a 13-yd pass to Hakeem Nicks but the Irish defense would block another XP attempt making the score 31–19. The Irish would strike back with Quinn hitting Jeff Samardzija with a 42-yd pass to make the score 38–19. UNC would repeat their earlier tandem with Dailey throwing a 72-yd pass to Nicks to cut the deficit to 38–26. But that would be UNC's last hurrah in this game as the Irish defense would prevent anymore scoring and the lone score of the 4th quarter was Darius Walker's 1-yd run to give 45–26 final.

Air Force
Pregame Line: ND −11.5

Less Than a minute into the game Brady Quinn proved just why he's one of the top QBs in College Football today and he didn't stop there going 14 of 19 for 207 yards passing and 4 TDs. At :54 seconds Quinn hit Jeff Samardzija for a 51-yd TD pass and a 7–0 lead. Less than five minutes later he threw a 1-yd pass to John Carlson to put Notre Dame up 14–0. At 8:40 into the game Air Force got on the board when Zach Sasser kicked a 32-yd field goal to shrink the deficit to 14–3. But Quinn would respond with a 24-yd pass to Rhema McKnight. Air Force was able to block the Extra Point Attempt and Notre Dame was now up 20–3 to finish up the 1st quarter. The second quarter showed off a lot of good defense including a blocked FG attempt that saw Terrail Lambert return the blocked kick 76-yds for a TD to put Notre Dame up 27–3 at the half.

Brady Quinn came out of halftime and with 8:33 left in the quarter threw a 23-yd pass to Marcus Freeman, but Air Force once again block Carl Gioia's XP attempt putting Notre Dame up 33–3. And with :17 seconds left in the quarter Shaun Carney threw a 12-yd pass to Beau Suder to make it 33–10 to close out the 3rd quarter of play. The 4th quarter saw Darius Walker run in a TD from 4-yds out with Gioia missing the XP attempt giving Notre Dame a 39–10 lead. Carney then hit Jacobe Kendrick for a 7-yd TD to give the game a 39–17 final.

Army
Pregame Line: ND −36

In the final home game for the team's senior class, the Irish took the field donning their special green jerseys. The first quarter of the game featured good defense by both teams including a stop on 4th down by the Irish and a pick that led to 3 by Army to give the Black Knights an early 3–0 lead. But in the second quarter the Irish came out firing and less than a minute into the 2nd Brady Quinn handed the ball to Darius Walker and he ran it in 10-yds for the Touchdown making it 7–3 Notre Dame. After a Defensive stop by the Irish they got the ball back and on 9 plays drove down field topping it off with Quinn throwing a 13-yd pass to Jeff Samardzija for the Irish's 2nd TD, but Gioia missed the PAT making the score 13–3 Notre Dame. With just over a minute left in the 1st half Brady Quinn hooked up with Rhema McKnight for an 8-yd touchdown reception and this time Carl Gioia hit the PAT giving Notre Dame a 20–3 lead going into halftime.

The Irish kept up the offensive onslaught to start off the 2nd half, scoring a touchdown when receiver David Grimes recovered teammate Darius Walker's fumble in the endzone to give Notre Dame a 27–3 lead.  The next Black Knights drive saw an interception by the Irish which led to a 24-yd pass from Quinn to McKnight for a TD extending their lead to 34–3. 4 minutes into the 4th quarter Notre Dame struck again with Darius Walker taking it in from 8-yds out to make it a 41–3 lead for Notre Dame. The drive started out with great field position due to Michael Richardson's 2nd pick of the day. On the last play of the game with no time left on the clock Army was finally able to make it into the endzone on a 12-yd pass from David Pevoto to Tim Dunn to make it a 41–9 final.

USC
Pregame Line: USC −7

Notre Dame visited the Coliseum with a four-game losing streak to the Trojans.  After the epic 2005 game, the Irish were hopeful that they could end their losing streak.  The Trojans, however, knew that with a win they would still be in the national title hunt.  The game started with the Irish receiving the ball and Brady Quinn throwing a quick 38-yard pass to Rhema McKnight.  The Irish drive stalled afterwards and turned the ball over after Quinn's fourth down pass flew errantly into the endzone.  The Trojans took over and quarterback John David Booty led them on a 61-yard drive that ended with a 9-yard touchdown pass to Dwayne Jarrett.  After the next Irish drive ended with a punt and a return by the Trojans to the Irish 26, Booty completed another touchdown pass to Jarrett to put the Trojans ahead 14–0.  On the ensuing Irish drive, Quinn and Darius Walker brought the Irish downfield, allowing Carl Gioia to kick a field goal.  The first quarter ended with the Trojans winning 14–3.  In the first drive of the second quarter, Booty led the Trojans to the Irish 1-yard line where he sneaked the ball in for USC's third touchdown of the game.  On the ensuing drive for the Irish, on a third down, Quinn scrambled for 59-yards, Notre Dame's longest run of the season, to bring the Irish to the USC 17-yard line.  Four plays later, a Darius Walker fumble was recovered by the Trojans giving them the ball back.  The Irish defense, however, held the Trojans for the first time forcing a punt.  The punt was partially blocked giving the Irish the ball back on the 7-yard line.  On the next play, Quinn threw a touchdown to Marcus Freeman.  The next two drives by the Trojans both ended when Booty threw an interception, but the Irish couldn't capitalize on either, turning the ball over on downs two more times.  The half ended with the Trojans leading 21–10.

The second half began with a Trojan drive of 65-yards capped with a Chauncey Washington 2-yard touchdown run.  The only other score of the third quarter came on Notre Dame's second drive of 58-yards, when Quinn hit Rhema McKnight for a 2-yard touchdown pass on fourth down.  The fourth quarter began with the Trojans driving to an eventual 32-yard field goal by Mario Danelo.  After the Irish were held, Booty threw a 43-yard touchdown pass to Dwayne Jarrett to give the Trojans a 37–17 lead (Danelo missed the extra point).  Quinn drove the Irish 78-yards and threw a 2-yard touchdown pass to Jeff Samardzija to put the Irish deficit to 13 points.  However, the onside kick attempt, was recovered by Brian Cushing, who ran it back to give the Trojans a 20-point lead again.  Notre Dame's last drive would end on another failed fourth down attempt, giving the Trojans the 44–24 win.

Sugar Bowl

Post-season

Awards
After the season, a four Irish players were nominated for or won postseason awards. Geoff Price, was named as a Ray Guy Award semi-finalist, Tom Zbikowski was named as a Jim Thorpe Award semi-finalist, and John Carlson was named as a John Mackey Award finalist. Brady Quinn, after finishing third in balloting for the Heisman Trophy, was named a finalist to two top quarterbacking awards, the Johnny Unitas Award and the Davey O'Brien Award, and won two player of the year awards, the Maxwell Award and the Cingular All-American Player of the Year.

Along with the award winners, six Irish players were named to All-American lists. Sam Young was named by The Sporting News as a first team freshman All-American. Five players were named by Sports Illustrated, including Quinn on the second team, and Jeff Samardzija, Rhema McKnight, John Carlson, and Geoff Price as honorable mentions. The AP named Quinn and Samardzija on their second team and Tom Zbikowski on their third team, while Samardzija and Zbikowski were named by the Walter Camp Football Foundation on their second team. Finally, Samardzija was named by the Football Writers Association of America on their first team as well as being named, for the second time, as a Consensus All-American by the NCAA.

NFL Draft
In the 2007 NFL Draft seven players were taken, including offensive starters Quinn, Ryan Harris and Dan Santucci and defensive starters Victor Abiamiri, Derek Landri, Mike Richardson and Chinedum Ndukwe. Five others also signed contracts with NFL teams, while Samardzija signed a deal with the Chicago Cubs as a baseball pitcher.

References

Notre Dame
Notre Dame Fighting Irish football seasons
Notre Dame Fighting Irish football